Žigovi  is a village in the municipalities of Novo Goražde, Republika Srpska and Goražde, Bosnia and Herzegovina.

Demographics 
According to the 2013 census, its population was 20, all Bosniaks, with 12 living in the Novo Goražde part and 8 in the Goražde part.

References

Populated places in Novo Goražde
Populated places in Goražde